Aureliana fasciculata is a species of plant in the family Solanaceae. It is endemic to Brazil. It is threatened by habitat loss.

References

Physaleae
Endemic flora of Brazil
Conservation dependent plants
Vulnerable flora of South America
Taxonomy articles created by Polbot
Plants described in 1829